The House at 37 West Cayuga Street in the village of Moravia in Cayuga County, New York is a historic home.  It is a two-story, frame, Italianate style residence.  The property contains the house, built about 1880, and a board and batten carriage house, probably built about 1870.

It was listed on the National Register of Historic Places in 1995.

References

External links

Houses on the National Register of Historic Places in New York (state)
Italianate architecture in New York (state)
Houses in Cayuga County, New York
National Register of Historic Places in Cayuga County, New York
Carriage houses
Moravia (village), New York